The Gorin, also known as "Goryun" and "Garin", is a river in Khabarovsk Krai, Russia.

It flows across the Solnechny and Komsomolsky districts. Over 80% of the river basin is covered by forests. The Komsomolsk Nature Reserve, a protected area, is in its lower course, in the area of its confluence with the Amur.

Course
The Gorin is a left tributary of the Amur. The lower course is very swampy and the river forms wide meanders. Finally it meets the Amur  from its mouth.

There are 879 lakes in the river basin, the largest of which is Evoron. The river freezes between mid-November and the end of April or the beginning of May.

Fauna
The river is an important spawning ground for Pacific salmon, chum salmon and pink salmon. Lenok and grayling are also abundant in its waters.

See also
List of rivers of Russia

References

External links 

Rivers of Khabarovsk Krai